The 25th edition of the Vuelta Ciclista de Chile was held from March 12 to March 24, 2002.

Stages

2002-03-24: Santiago — Santiago (60 km)

Final classification

References 
 cyclingnews

Vuelta Ciclista de Chile
Chile
Vuelta Ciclista
March 2002 sports events in South America